John or Jack Lawson may refer to:

Military
John Lawson (Royal Navy officer) (c. 1615–1665), English naval officer and republican
John Lawson (Medal of Honor) (1837–1919), U.S. Navy sailor
John K. Lawson (1886–1941), Senior Canadian officer during the Battle of Hong Kong, World War II

Politics
John D. Lawson (politician) (1816–1896), U.S. Representative from New York
John W. Lawson (1837–1905), U.S. Representative from Virginia
Sir John Lawson, 1st Baronet, of Knavesmire Lodge (1856–1919), British Unionist politician 
Jack Lawson (1881–1965), British trade unionist and Labour politician
John Lawson (Australian politician) (1897–1956)

Sports
John Lawson (cyclist) (1872–1902), Swedish cycling champion
John Lawson (baseball) (1887–1964), American baseball player
Ivor Lawson (John Ballantyne Lawson, 1883–1958), Australian rules footballer for Collingwood, St Kilda and Richmond
John Lawson (footballer) (1925–1990), English footballer

Others
John Lawson (explorer) (1674–1711), English explorer in colony of North Carolina
John Lawson (theologian) (1709–1759), Irish academic
John Parker Lawson (died 1852), clergyman of the Episcopal Church of Scotland and historian
John Lawson (actor) (1865–1920), English actor known as "Humanity" Lawson
John Howard Lawson (1894–1977), American writer
John R. Lawson (died 1945), Colorado union leader
John Lawson (children's author) (1923–1993), also known as John S. "Jack" Lawson, of New York and Virginia
John D. Lawson (scientist) (1923–2008), British engineer and physicist
John K. Lawson (artist) (born 1962), British-American artist
Jack Lawson (Blue Heelers), a character from the Australian TV series Blue Heelers